Lyman Whitaker is an American sculptor working in southern Utah. Whitaker has been a working sculptor for more than 50 years and is known for his kinetic sculptures.

Early work
Whitaker's early work consisted of largely representational sculpture, varying from traditional bronzes, to small mobiles and public fountains.

Recent work
During the past 40 years he has primarily focused upon creating "wind sculptures" which are handmade kinetic art that responds to the changing currents of the wind.

Whitaker's work is represented at art galleries and in private collections throughout the United States and abroad, as well as in museums and public spaces.

References

External links

Selected exhibitions
"Residents enjoying new sculptures at Vlasis Park" St. Louis Today

20th-century American sculptors
Modern sculptors
Living people
Year of birth missing (living people)
21st-century American sculptors